Kayan is a village in Baghlan Province in north eastern Afghanistan. It is located in the valley of Kayan, some 30 kilometres west of Dushi. The residents of Kayan valley are mostly members of Sadat and Hazara tribes. The Sayyids follow Shi´a Islam.

See also 
Baghlan Province

References

External links
Satellite map at Maplandia.com

Populated places in Baghlan Province